Talumolo is one of the villages in Kota Timur, Gorontalo, Gorontalo Province, Indonesia.

References

Talumolo